Riina Koskinen (born 17 April 1997) is a Finnish female professional squash player.

During the 2018 PSA World Tour, she reached 98th position in January 2018, which was her highest career PSA singles ranking.

References

External links 

 

1997 births
Living people
Finnish female squash players
People from Kuopio
Sportspeople from North Savo
20th-century Finnish women
21st-century Finnish women
Competitors at the 2022 World Games